Kentstown is a village in County Meath in Ireland at the junction of the R153 and R150 regional roads.

History
The ruins of a medieval church can be found in Danestown, Kentstown, while in the present St. Mary's Parish Church (Church of Ireland) an effigy in the shape of a medieval Norman knight is carved on a slab. The knight wears a tight-fitting jupon and has a dagger on his right hip. An inscription, in Latin, accompanies it: "Here lies Thomas de Tuite, Knight, once Lord of Kentstown, who died on 2nd June 1363".

Demographics
In the 20 years between the 1996 and 2016 census, the population of Kentstown more than tripled from 324 to 1,179 inhabitants. According to the 2016 census, 71% of the village's homes (252 of 353 households) were built between 1991 and 2010.

Transport
Kentstown village is served by Bus Éireann route 105, which operates hourly in each direction providing links to Duleek, Drogheda and in the other direction to Ashbourne, Ratoath and Blanchardstown. In addition, route 103X (Dublin-Ashbourne-Navan) provides a limited service of a morning journey to Dublin and an evening journey to Navan Mondays to Fridays inclusive.

Nanny river
The Nanny rises outside of Kentstown, and flows about 18 miles to the Irish sea at Laytown.

Notes

Towns and villages in County Meath